The Escola Japonesa de São Paulo ("São Paulo Japanese School") is a Japanese international day school in , Capão Redondo, Subprefecture of Campo Limpo, São Paulo, operated by the Sociedade Japonesa de Educação e Cultura. It serves students from 6 to 15 years of age in grades 1 through 9. Most of the students have Japanese company executives as parents. The school uses the Japanese curriculum.

History
The school opened on August 14, 1967.  From the time of opening until 1981, school enrollment increased due to a corresponding increase in Japanese corporate operations. Enrollment decreased after 1981. In 1997 it had 205 students. Due to an increase in Japanese corporate involvement, from 2011 the student population has increased. As of January 17, 2014 the school has 238 students including 178 elementary school students and 60 junior high students.

See also
 Japanese community of São Paulo
 Brazilian schools in Japan
 List of Brazilian schools in Japan

References

Further reading
Available online:
 "日本人学校の現状" (Archive). São Paulo Shimbun. 13 March 2008.
 "サンパウロ日本人学校＝３９年目の寄付活動＝福祉団体、日語センターへ" (Archive). Nikkey Shimbun. July 15, 2014.
 "サンパウロ日本人学校＝中学生４３人が職場体験＝１７の事業所で興味深々" (Archive). Nikkey Shimbun. January 11, 2013.

Not available online:
 星野 享永. "サンパウロ日本人学校の勤務を終えて." 教育委員会月報 33(11), p28-34, 1982-02. 第一法規出版. See profile at CiNii.
 平田 博嗣. "国際的視野に立った現地理解教育のあり方 : サンパウロ日本人学校における実践を通して." 研究紀要 29, 159-172, 1993-03. Tokyo Gakugei University. See profile at CiNii.
Articles from former employees:
 初鹿 野修 (前サンパウロ日本人学校教諭・那覇市教育委員会学校教育課教諭). "サンパウロ日本人学校での国際理解学習 : 郷土の文化「エイサー」・移民学習を通して." 在外教育施設における指導実践記録 26, 55-58, 2003. Tokyo Gakugei University. See profile at CiNii.
 岡田 要 (前サンパウロ日本人学校教頭・愛知県岡崎市立城南小学校教頭). "在外教育施設の運営とその改善 : サンパウロ日本人学校での3年間の勤務を振り返って." 在外教育施設における指導実践記録 26, 81-88, 2003. Tokyo Gakugei University. See profile at CiNii.
 吉田 英明 (北海道札幌市立手稲東中学校・サンパウロ日本人学校(前)). "サンパウロ日本人学校での音楽実践(第2章教科指導)." 在外教育施設における指導実践記録 27, 17-19, 2004. Tokyo Gakugei University. See profile at CiNii.

Books produced by the school:
 サンパウロ日本人学校. サンパウロ日本人学校における現地理解教育の計画と実践 : 東京学芸大学海外子女教育センター共同研究協力校レポート. See profile at CiNii.

External links
 Escola Japonesa de São Paulo 

Asian-Brazilian culture in São Paulo
International schools in São Paulo
Sao Paulo
Secondary schools in Brazil
Educational institutions established in 1967
1967 establishments in Brazil